Jaimie E Leonard (died 8 June 2013) was a lieutenant colonel in the United States Army and a part of the Headquarters and Headquarters Company, 2nd Brigade Combat Team, 10th Mountain Division, Fort Drum, New York. She was 39 years old when she died in Sharana, Afghanistan, as a result of a small arms-related injury. Previous deployments include Bosnia (1999), Iraq (2005), and Afghanistan in 2011 where she served as part of Regional Command (South) HQ.  On a subsequent deployment to Afghanistan she acquired fatal injuries in 2013 from an insider attack in Paktika province. In her career as a military intelligence officer, Leonard was honored with two Bronze Stars, two Meritorious Service Medals, the Joint Commendation Medal, three Army Commendation Medals, the Valorous Unit Award, the Meritorious Unit Commendation, the National Defense Service Medal, Armed Forces Expeditionary Medal, Afghanistan Campaign Medals, Iraq Campaign Medal, the Global War on Terrorism Expeditionary Medal, the Global War on Terrorism Service Medal, the Korean Defense Service Medal, the Army Service Ribbon, five Overseas Service Ribbons, the NATO Badge, Parachutist Badge, and the Army Staff Identification Badge.  She is the most senior female US military officer to be killed in combat.

References

   

American military personnel killed in the War in Afghanistan (2001–2021)
United States Army colonels
2013 deaths
United States Army personnel of the War in Afghanistan (2001–2021)